In 1904, there was no World Series played between the champions of the two major leagues, the Boston Americans (now the Boston Red Sox) of the American League (AL) and the New York Giants (now the San Francisco Giants) of the National League (NL). Boston had clinched their second consecutive AL championship, while New York won the 1904 NL title by a wide margin of 13 games. With still no formal arrangement in place between the two leagues regarding the staging of the World Series, the Giants under owner John T. Brush refused to play against a team from what they considered an inferior league. The resulting criticism from fans and writers caused Brush to reverse course during the offseason and lead the effort to formalize the World Series between the two leagues.

Background

Due to a business rivalry between the two leagues, especially in New York, and to personal animosity between Giants manager John McGraw and American League president Ban Johnson, the Giants declined to meet the champions of the "junior" (or "minor") league. McGraw said his Giants were already the world champions because they were the champions of the "only real major league".

During spring training in March 1904, Giants owner John T. Brush said "there will never be a series" between 
the New York-based teams—his Giants of the National League and the American League's New York Highlanders—in response to a preseason offer from Highlanders co-owner Frank J. Farrell. In July 1904, as reported in Sporting Life, Brush stated that his NL club would not play the AL club "if each wins the pennant in its respective league", in contradiction of a preseason agreement for a championship series between the leagues. At that point in the season, the Giants were comfortably on top of the NL standings, and the Highlanders (now the New York Yankees) were just  games behind the Boston Americans. The AL race went down to the wire, and the Highlanders temporarily took over first place on October 7 when they defeated Boston. But the Americans won three of their four remaining games to clinch the AL pennant, and finished  games ahead of the Highlanders (who lost three of their final four games) in the final standings of October 10. The Giants, who had won the NL by a wide margin (13 games), stuck to and broadened their plan, refusing to play any AL club, either the champion Boston team or the crosstown New York team, in the proposed "exhibition" series (as they considered it).

Summary

Boston Americans
Boston had defeated National League champion Pittsburgh in the 1903 World Series, a contest arranged by the two champion clubs, not by the leagues themselves.

New York Giants

The Giants maintained that the rules for the World Series were haphazardly defined. In the 1903 series, as well as postseason series between the National League and the American Association in the 1880s, the rules for a given season's "World's Championship Series" had been whatever the two participating clubs had agreed upon. The World Series was not a compulsory event and was not governed by an authoritative body, thus the Giants were free to refuse to participate in such an event.

Stung by criticism from fans and writers, Brush drafted rules that both leagues adopted in mid-February 1905. The rules compelled the two winning clubs to participate and governed the annual determination of sites, dates, ticket prices and division of receipts.  These new rules essentially made the World Series the premier annual Major League Baseball event.

Aftermath
Boston slumped in 1905, while New York repeated its NL championship and won the 1905 World Series against the Philadelphia Athletics. The two teams eventually met in the 1912 World Series with the Red Sox winning in eight games (Game 2 was a tie). The Series has been played every year since except , when a 232-day players' strike ended the season in mid-August.

References

Further reading
 
 

World Series
Boston Red Sox postseason
New York Giants (NL) postseason
World Series
Major League Baseball controversies
Cancelled baseball competitions